Nalchik Airport  is a small airport in Kabardino-Balkaria, Russia, located  northeast of Nalchik.  It handles small airliners; the terminal area has space for 12 jets and 6 small aircraft and supports 24-hour operations.

The airport has had a minor military presence with the 368 OSAZ (368th Independent Mixed Aviation Regiment) which flew Antonov An-12 cargo aircraft.

The airport is currently home to the Nalchik Mountain range Test Centre of the 929th State Flight Test Centre named for V. P. Chkalov as part of the Russian Air Force.

Airlines and destinations

Accidents and incidents 
 In 1994 Pulkovo Aviation Enterprise Flight 9045 crashed on approach while carrying  of coins from the Saint Petersburg Mint.

References

External links
 Nalchik Airport official site
 Polyot-Sirena  Flight schedule

Airports built in the Soviet Union
Airports in Kabardino-Balkaria